Annika Narbe (born 9 October 1971) is a Swedish former professional tennis player.

Narbe, who comes from Malmö, reached a career best singles ranking of 224 on the professional tour, twice featuring in the main draw of the Swedish Open. She won two ITF singles titles and five ITF doubles titles.

A Swedish national champion in 1992 and 1993, she is the mother of professional tennis player Philip Möbius.

ITF finals

Singles: 6 (2–4)

Doubles: 8 (5–3)

References

External links
 
 

1971 births
Living people
Swedish female tennis players
Sportspeople from Malmö
20th-century Swedish women
21st-century Swedish women